All or almost all rivers in Europe have alternative names in different languages. Some rivers have also undergone name changes for political or other reasons. This article provides known alternative names for all major European rivers. It also includes alternative names of some lesser rivers that are important because of their location or history.

This article does not offer any opinion about what the "original", "official", "real", or "correct" name of any river is or was. Rivers are listed alphabetically by their current best-known name in English. The English version is followed by variants in other languages, in alphabetical order by name, and then by any historical variants and former names.

Foreign names that are the same as their English equivalents may be listed, to provide an answer to the question "What is that name in...?".



A

B

C

D

E

F

G

H

I

J

K

L

M

N

O

P

R

S

T

U

V

W

Y

Z

See also
 Exonym and endonym
 List of rivers of Europe
 Latin names of European rivers
 List of alternative country names
 List of country names in various languages
 List of European regions with alternative names
 List of European cities with alternative names
 List of Latin place names in Europe
 List of places

References

External links
 Place names of Europe

Rivers
Rivers
Europe
List of European rivers with alternative names

Малхъ